Robert Alfred Lurie (born 1929) is a real estate magnate, philanthropist, and former owner of the San Francisco Giants franchise of Major League Baseball from March 2, 1976, until January 12, 1993.

Early life
Lurie was born to a Jewish family in San Francisco, the son of Babette (née Greenbaum) and Louis Lurie.  In 1972, he took over the real estate company founded in 1922 by his father whose name is synonymous with San Francisco real estate development during the middle part of the 20th century. The company built a number of properties along Montgomery Street over the years, including a building Bank of America bought and tore down for its world headquarters at 555 California St., and it still owns many of them. Other notable local properties owned by Lurie are the Mark Hopkins Hotel and the Curran Theatre.

Lurie's real estate company has also upgraded some older properties in San Francisco. For example, Lurie invested $20 million in 901 Market St. and brought in retailers Copeland's Sports and Marshalls, transforming the  mid-Market Street eyesore into a winner.

Giants Ownership
In 1975, Giants owner Horace Stoneham agreed in principle to sell the team to a group headed by the Labatt Brewing Company, which intended to move the team to Toronto.  Mayor George Moscone won an injunction to stop the sale, and then persuaded Lurie, a Giants minority owner and board member, to put together a group that would buy the team and keep it in San Francisco.  In February 1976, Lurie announced he was putting together a bid to buy the Giants for $8 million.

His original investment partner was former Texas Rangers owner Bob Short. However, Lurie insisted that since he was a San Francisco resident (Short lived in Minneapolis), he should have the final say in operational and league matters. The other National League owners were concerned about Short's checkered tenure as owner of the Rangers (formerly the second incarnation of the Washington Senators), and also insisted that Lurie be empowered to cast the Giants' vote at owners' meetings if the deal were to be approved. Short was unwilling to agree to this and backed out of the deal on March 2, 1976–just days before the start of spring training. Racing a league-imposed five-hour deadline, Phoenix, Arizona-based meat-packer Bud Herseth agreed to become Lurie's new partner, putting up half of the purchase price. The transaction was unanimously approved by the other National League owners later that day. Lurie held a 51 percent controlling interest, with Herseth holding the other 49 percent. Lurie said that while he and Herseth were "equal partners in operation," he would cast the team's vote in league matters. By comparison, Stoneham's father, Charles, had bought the then-New York Giants for $1 million in 1919; Horace had inherited the team upon his father's death in 1936 and moved it to San Francisco in 1958.

Lurie became the Giants' sole owner when he bought out Herseth three years later in early spring of 1979. Although Toronto was awarded its own expansion team, the Blue Jays, in 1977, it would not be the last time that San Francisco's baseball fans would fear the possibility of losing their team.

The 1970s was a generally disappointing decade for the Giants and the trend continued throughout Lurie’s ownership. In 1985, a year which saw the Giants lose 100 games (the most in franchise history), Lurie responded by hiring Al Rosen as general manager. Under Rosen's tenure, the Giants promoted promising rookies such as Will Clark and Robby Thompson, and made canny trades to acquire such players as Kevin Mitchell, Dave Dravecky, Candy Maldonado, and Rick Reuschel. The Giants would not have a better influx of young position players since that period until the mid-2000s.

Lurie tried to make improvements to the notoriously unaccommodating Candlestick Park, but concluded there was no way the Giants could succeed there. However, in both 1987 and 1989, San Francisco voters rejected two stadium referendums to build a new downtown park, even though the Giants agreed to pick up half of the tab. Worse still, a plan to improve the existing stadium failed by an even wider margin. Frustrated, Lurie looked south toward Silicon Valley, only to see San Jose and Santa Clara voters reject three more proposals to build a Giants ballpark.

Finally, in June 1992, Lurie announced that he would sell the Giants, claiming that he could no longer sustain the financial losses (averaging about $2–7 million annually) that had accumulated over the last few years. During his announcement, Lurie appeared visibly emotional, his voice breaking as he explained his hopes for turning the business side around when he bought the team in 1976. Nonetheless, losing teams and poor weather conditions at Candlestick Park kept many fans away, and at the time of Lurie's announcement, the team had finished with a 72-90 record.

When no credible offers surfaced from Bay Area interests, Lurie eventually agreed to sell the Giants for $115 million to an ownership group headed by Vince Naimoli (original owner of the Tampa Bay Rays) with plans to move the club to St. Petersburg, Florida. However, the National League nixed the deal, pressuring Lurie to sell the club to Bay Area investors. In an 11th hour effort to save the team from moving, a group of local investors headed by Safeway chairman Peter Magowan, offered Lurie $100 million for the Giants.

Post-Giants Ownership
He is also involved in various philanthropic activities, which include the $20 million Louis R. Lurie Foundation. Lurie is an adviser of the Alternative Golf Association (known as "Flogton").

References

External links
 Lurie for Selling Giants — New York Times article
 San Jose mayor seeks major league team — ESPN.com
 Giants to Open Stadium Talks — New York Times article
 Giants Will Stay Put — New York Times article
 Giants history and timeline — Official Giants website
 Bob Lurie ownership chronology — Baseball America Executive Database
 Bob Lurie trades Giants for new real estate lineup — San Francisco Business Times
Bye-Bye, Baby, Lurie's speech to the Commonwealth Club of California in 1976 on keeping the Giants in San Francisco.
 - Foundation Center profile

1929 births
Living people
Jewish American baseball people
Major League Baseball owners
San Francisco Giants owners
American real estate businesspeople
21st-century American Jews